The following lists events that happened during 1919 in the Colony of Southern Rhodesia.

Events
 The Privy Council of the United Kingdom rejects African or British South Africa Company rule of the Colony of Southern Rhodesia stating that it belongs to the crown.

Births
 8 April - Ian Douglas Smith, Prime Minister of Rhodesia from 1965–1979, is born in Selukwe (died 2007)

References 

 
Years of the 20th century in Southern Rhodesia
Southern Rhodesia
Southern Rhodesia
1910s in Southern Rhodesia